The Tomb of the Matriarchs, (Hebrew: קבר האמהות, Kever ha'Imahot), in Tiberias, Israel, is the traditional burial place of several biblical women:

Bilhah, handmaid of Rachel.
Zilpah, handmaid of Leah.
Jochebed, mother of Moses.
Zipporah, wife of Moses.
Elisheba, wife of Aaron.
Abigail, one of King David's wives.

The marble structure beside a modern apartment building block is surrounded by a stone wall.

See also
 List of burial places of biblical figures

References

Buildings and structures in Tiberias
M
Jewish pilgrimage sites
Women and death
Judaism and women
Women in the Hebrew Bible
Tombs in Israel